is a Japanese composer, music arranger, and bassist. He is best known for scoring and composing music for film, TV dramas, anime and video games. He has worked on more than 100 titles in the last 20 years. His most recognized composing works are AIBOU: Tokyo Detective Duo series (2002–present), Kamichu!  (2005), Kaseifu no Mita (2011), Tiger & Bunny (2011), Saint Seiya: Legend of Sanctuary (2014), Inuyashiki (2017), B: The Beginning (2018), and Dororo (2019).

His score for the anime film, Blood: The Last Vampire, was nominated for the 2000 UK Music Awards under the soundtrack category, and subsequently awarded the top prize at the Japan Media Arts Festival in 2001 by the Agency for Cultural affairs. In 2018, Shadowverse original soundtracks became the highest-ranking album on iTunes, surpassing Shallow by Lady Gaga.

On May 17, 2019, Anime Expo announced Yoshihiro Ike will be holding an orchestral concert at Anime Expo 2019. Ike's collection of anime soundtracks from Tiger & Bunny, Saint Seiya, B: The Beginning, and Dororo as well as his works on game soundtracks from Rage of Bahamut: Genesis and Shadowverse will be performed in his first international concert with over 50 of musicians from Los Angeles and Nashville, along with a special performance by a koto harpist and a shakuhachi flutist from Japan.

Biography 
In 1985, he formed the group AIKE BAND, and they released their debut album, 'In the First Sense' in 1987.

In 1988, he joined David T. Walker's solo album Ahimsa as a bassist in Los Angeles.

In 2000, his score for Blood: The Last Vampire was nominated for the 2000 UK Music Awards under the soundtrack category.

In 2001, Blood: The Last Vampire was awarded the top prize at the Japan Media Arts Festival in 2001 by the Agency for Cultural affairs.

In 2006, Kamichu! received an Excellence Prize at the 2005 Japan Media Arts Festival.

In 2007, he released his 20-year compilation album "Yoshihiro the BEST - 20th Anniversary Selection" which includes his iconic tracks from 40 different films.

In 2007, Japanese animation commercial for Kao Corporation "ASIENCE ~Kami wa Onna no Inochi" where Ike was in charge of the music received a Gold Winner Prize in Television/Chinema section at London International Awards.

In 2008, K-tai Investigator 7 was nominated in Kids&Young section at Japan Media Arts Festival.

In 2012, Ike won the 35th Japan Academy Film Prize for Outstanding Achievement in Music Award for his work on The Detective Is in the Bar.

In 2016, Ike released his 10-year compilation album "Yoshihiro Ike Works 2006-2016" including 51 tracks of his music from movies, television series, and Japanese animation from 2006 to 2016.

Discography

Compilation albums

TV works

Anime works

Movie works

Game works

References 

1963 births
20th-century Japanese composers
20th-century Japanese male musicians
21st-century Japanese composers
21st-century Japanese male musicians
Anime composers
Japanese film score composers
Japanese male film score composers
Japanese music arrangers
Living people
Musicians from Kanagawa Prefecture